Steven Lewis Mogford (born 27 June 1956) is a British businessman. He is the Chief Executive of United Utilities Group plc, the UK's largest listed water company.

Early life
Mogford was educated at Barking Abbey Grammar School, Essex and Queen Elizabeth College, London, where he obtained a First Class degree in Astrophysics, Maths and Physics.

Career
Mogford began his career in 1977 as a supply engineer with British Aerospace Military Aircraft. He remained with British Aerospace until 2007 when he was Chief Operating Officer for Programmes at BAE Systems plc.

In May 2007 he joined Finmeccanica's SELEX Galileo as Chief Executive.

Mogford has been the Chief Executive of United Utilities Group plc since March 2011, replacing Philip Nevill Green. He was a non-executive director with Carillion until September 2015.

Personal life
Steve Mogford lives in Chorley in Lancashire.

References

1956 births
Living people
British chief executives
British corporate directors
Chief operating officers
People educated at Barking Abbey Grammar School